Geranyl-pyrophosphate—olivetolic acid geranyltransferase (GOT) is an enzyme with systematic name geranyl-diphosphate:olivetolate geranyltransferase. This enzyme catalyses the following chemical reaction

 geranyl diphosphate + 2,4-dihydroxy-6-pentylbenzoate  diphosphate + cannabigerolate

Part of the cannabinoids biosynthetic pathway of the plant Cannabis sativa.

References

External links 
 

EC 2.5.1